Kelly Elaine Grieve (born May 10, 1989, in Asheville, N.C.) is an American softball player. She attended Enka High School and University of Tennessee. She plays as Outfielder and Center Field. With United States women's national softball team she won 2011 World Cup of Softball.

References

External links 
 USA Softball

1989 births
Living people
Tennessee Volunteers softball players
Pan American Games gold medalists for the United States
Pan American Games medalists in softball
Softball players at the 2011 Pan American Games
Sportspeople from Asheville, North Carolina
Softball players from North Carolina
Medalists at the 2011 Pan American Games